Governor Simcoe may refer to:
 John Graves Simcoe (1752–1806), Governor of Upper Canada
 Governor Simcoe Secondary School, a high school in St. Catharines, Ontario
 Governor Simcoe, a schooner launched in 1793 and scuttled in 1814